Suburban Lawns is the sole studio album by American band Suburban Lawns, released in 1981 by I.R.S. Records.

Reception 

AllMusic called it "an off-kilter triumph", with the album also receiving favorable reviews from The Big Takeover and Louder Than War. Conversely, Trouser Press called it "highly ordinary" and "a sub-Devo mesh of hiccupping vocals, angular tunes with tiresome stop-start rhythms and a high, weedy guitar/organ sound".

Track listing

References

External links 
 

1981 debut albums
Suburban Lawns albums